The Museum of Comparative Zoology (formally the Agassiz Museum of Comparative Zoology and often abbreviated to MCZ) is a zoology museum located on the grounds of Harvard University in Cambridge, Massachusetts. It is one of three natural-history research museums at Harvard, whose public face is the Harvard Museum of Natural History. Harvard MCZ's collections consist of some 21 million specimens, of which several thousand are on rotating display at the public museum.  In July 2021, Gonzalo Giribet, Alexander Agassiz Professor of Zoology at Harvard and Curator of Invertebrate Zoology, was announced as the new director of the museum.

Many of the exhibits in the public museum have not only zoological interest, but also historical significance. Past exhibits have included a fossil sand dollar found by Charles Darwin in 1834, Captain James Cook's mamo, and two pheasants that once belonged to George Washington, now on loan to Mount Vernon in Virginia.

The research collections of the MCZ are not open to the public.

History
The Museum of Comparative Zoology was founded in 1859 through the efforts of zoologist Louis Agassiz; the museum used to be referred to as "The Agassiz" after its founder. Agassiz designed the collection to illustrate the variety and comparative relationships of animal life. Many female paleontologists, such as Elvira Wood, were involved in the early development of the museum.

The Radcliffe Zoological Laboratory was created in 1894 when Radcliffe College rented a space on the fifth floor of the MCZ to convert into a women's laboratory. Prior to this acquisition, Radcliffe science laboratories were taught using inadequate facilities, converting spaces such as bathrooms in old houses into physics laboratories, in which Harvard professors often refused to teach. The laboratory space was converted from an office or storage closet, and was sandwiched between other invertebrate storage rooms on the fifth floor.

Departments
The museum has nine departments with research collections: Entomology, Herpetology, Ichthyology, Invertebrate Paleontology, Invertebrate Zoology, Mammalogy, Malacology, Ornithology, and Vertebrate Paleontology. The Ernst Mayr Library and its archives form the tenth department of the museum. The library is a founding member of the Biodiversity Heritage Library.

Publications
The museum publishes two journals: the Bulletin of the Museum of Comparative Zoology at Harvard College, first published in 1869, and Breviora, first published in 1956.

Displays
In contrast to numerous more modern museums, the Harvard Museum of Natural History has many hundreds of stuffed animals on display, from the MCZ collections. The two-story Great Mammal Hall was renovated in 2009 in celebration of the 150th anniversary of founding of the museum.

Changing exhibitions in the Harvard Museum of Natural History have included "Evolution" (2008); "The Language of Color" (2008 to 2013); "Arthropods: Creatures that Rule" (2006); "New England Forests" (2011); and "Mollusks: Shelled Masters of the Marine Realm" (2012).

Gallery

References

External links

Official website

Harvard University museums
Natural history museums in Massachusetts
Dinosaur museums in the United States
Paleontology in Massachusetts
Shell museums
Museums in Cambridge, Massachusetts
University museums in Massachusetts
Museums established in 1859
1859 establishments in Massachusetts